Emmaus Baptist College is a private Landmark Missionary Baptist college in Brandon, Florida. Its focus is primarily religious with degrees in ministry and education.

History
The college was founded in 1954 as the Florida Baptist Institute and Seminary in Auburndale, Florida. Albert Garner served as President from 1954 to 1970. In 1957 the college moved to Lakeland, Florida, to a facility on West Olive Street overlooking Lake Beulah. The campus was centered around a circular building designed by Jacksonville architect Caleb L. Kelly, Jr. 

In 1990 the college moved to Brandon. The name was changed to Emmaus Baptist College after the death of Dr. Garner in 2007.

Segregation
The college published two books authored by President Garner advocating segregation, The Racial Issue "is God a God of Segregation?" in 1959 and Missionary Baptists and the Civil Rights and Segregation Issue 1954-1964 in 1964. In 1963, Garner discussed racial integration with President John F. Kennedy, expressing his fear that integration would read to marriage between races, stating that "We have deep moral and religious convictions that integration of the races is wrong and should be resisted." He also expounded before the Judiciary Committee of the US House of Representatives "that Federal efforts to force integration as a new social pattern of life is morally wrong, unChristian, and in conflict with the word and will of God as well as historic Christianity" in 1963.

Campus
The ten acre campus consists of more than a dozen buildings, including a Chapel, two educational buildings, several residences and four dormitories.

References

Seminaries and theological colleges in Florida
Universities and colleges in Hillsborough County, Florida